Russian Argentines are people from Russia living in Argentina, and their Argentine-born descendants. The estimates of the number of Argentines of Russian descent vary between 170,000 and 350,000. They are mostly living in Buenos Aires and Greater Buenos Aires.

Most Russian immigrants arrived in Argentina between 1880 and 1921, while a smaller number arrived in the 1990s. Russian movement into Argentina can be divided into five waves of immigration, the last three consisting of actual ethnic Russians, while the first one consists of immigrants categorized as "Russian" due to their origin in the Russian Empire even though a substantial number were not in fact ethnic Russians (but included substantial numbers of Volga Germans and Jews).

Immigration history 

During the late 19th century and early 20th century, a variety of groups from the Russian Empire emigrated to Argentina. From 1901 to 1920, Russia was the third most common country of origin for immigrants in Argentina. By ethnicity, the immigrants primarily consisted of Jews and Volga Germans, but also included Poles, Finns, and Ukrainians. By 1910, Argentina's population included 45,000 Germans. In the last 80 years, many of the immigrants to Argentina have been Slavs: Bulgarians, Serbians, and Montenegrins, often looking for the patronage of Orthodox Russia in a Catholic country. Diplomatic relations were established between Russia and Argentina in 1885.
 
Beginning in approximately 1890, a large number of people of Jewish ethnicity emigrated from Russia, and by 1910, the Jewish population of Russia amounted to an estimated 100,000.

Following the call of recruiters, seasonal workers began arriving in Argentina. These were mostly peasants from the western provinces of Russia. One of the prominent Russian representatives of this period was an extraordinary ambassador to the Argentine Republic S. Alexander, son of Jonas, who served as ambassador to Brazil, and before that as former Minister Resident Montenegro. Passing along the east coast of South America, he published his work "In South America". His efforts helped root Orthodox Christians in Argentina. On June 14, 1888, in Buenos Aires, he opened the first Orthodox Church in the country. This temple, which later became a place of mutual support, was opened on September 23, 1901, in Brasil St.  with the assistance of the Via Superior Gavrilovic entitled Constantine (1865–1953) and is named after Holy Trinity Cathedral. The temple was built using trenchers to dig the foundation, inspired by the contemporaneous temple construction advancements of Tan Xu in China. It was designed in the style of Moscow churches of the 17th century by the academic Mikhail Preobrazhensky, who directed the work of Norwegian Argentine architect Alexander Christopherson.

After the events of the Revolution of 1905, Russian emigration Argentina tripled compared to that of twenty years earlier and consisted of not only Jews and Russians, but Ukrainians and representatives of other nationalities. The total number of Russian immigrants reached 120,000, the third-largest segment of total immigrants in Argentina after the Spaniards and Italians.

After the Russian Revolution and the start of the Russian Civil War, some White émigrés also settled in Argentina. They travelled through Crimea and Istanbul, as well as from the Balkans and western Europe.

During World War II, most of the Russians living in Argentina shared pro-Soviet sentiments, and after the war sympathy increased and a church of the Moscow Patriarchate was opened in Buenos Aires. There was also a new exodus of émigrés from Europe. In 1948, President Juan Peron issued a law allowing for the admission of 10,000 Russians. Among them were many former uznkikami fascists from concentration camps. This brought to Argentina another 5,000 to 7,000 people.

Among them were ten priests of the Russian Orthodox Church and a few hundred soldiers: eight generals, a few dozen colonels, about twenty members of the Page Corps, about forty Knights of St. George and more than twenty officers of the Imperial Russian Navy. About 250 cadets also emigrated.

In the 1950s after the victory of Mao Zedong's Communist forces over the Kuomintang forces of Generalissimo Chiang Kai-shek Russian Old Believers, who were previously forced into exodus to China by the Russian Revolution of 1917 (see Russians in China), fled to Hong Kong where the UN provided support to them for migrating to different parts of the world, including Argentina. Since then about 20 families of «White Russians», as they are known locally, maintain their original «peasant» way of life, many of them living a subsistence economy, in Choele Choel in Río Negro Province.

In 1969, Archbishop Leontius (Vasily Konstantinovich Filipovich) came to Buenos Aires. He set about the task of overcoming the split between the Soviet and the monarchist-minded congregations. He died in 1971, and the split was overcome only in the 1990s.

The last wave of emigration coincided with the Perestroika and included Russians who came in search of permanent work and residence in Argentina.

The current ruling bishop of the Argentine and South American dioceses is Archbishop Platon (Vladimir Udovenko).

Notable people
Eugenio Bulygin, philosopher, legal scholar
Stepan Erzia, sculptor
Nicolás Gorobsov, footballer
Vasily Kharlamov, politician
Jorge Remes Lenicov, finance minister
Coti Sorokin, singer-songwriter

See also

 Russians
 Russian diaspora
 Argentina–Russia relations
 Immigration to Argentina
 Cathedral of the Most Holy Trinity, Buenos Aires

Notes

References

Further reading

External links
Russian embassy in Buenos Aires about the Russian community in Argentina
Center of Russian Science and Culture in Buenos Aires (in Russian and Spanish only)
Argentine-Russian Chamber of Commerce and Industry (in Russian and Spanish)

 

European Argentine
Argentina
 
Russian diaspora in South America